Rongqi Port is a cargo port in Shunde, Foshan, Guangdong, China. It is located at Banshawei, Desheng River in Daliang, Shunde.

The port started construction in 1986 and started service in 1987. In 1998, its passenger service was relocated to Shunde Port, but its cargo service is still in use until now.

References 

Ports and harbours of China
Shunde District